Cumerio Med was Bulgaria's largest copper smelting company producing around 240,000 tonnes of smelted copper and around 60,000 tonnes of copper cathodes each year. In 1997, the company was sold to Cumerio a company from Belgium for US$80 million but in 2007, the company was bought by German company Norddeutsche Affinerie.

References

External links
 Official website

Metal companies of Bulgaria